The 1988 British League season was the 54th season of the top tier of speedway in the United Kingdom and the 24th known as the British League.

Summary
Coventry Bees won the league for the second successive year and again by a 16 point margin. The Bees also reached the Knockout Cup final losing to Cradley Heath. Remarkably it was Cradley's seventh Cup win in 10 years. With the League Cup scrapped the Coventry team had less fixtures to ride and their pairing of Tommy Knudsen and Kelvin Tatum were once again the catalyst for the seasons success finishing 2nd and 4th respectively in the averages. Hans Nielsen topped the averages again for the sixth consecutive season.

Final table
M = Matches; W = Wins; D = Draws; L = Losses; Pts = Total Points

British League Knockout Cup
The 1988 Speedway Star British League Knockout Cup was the 50th edition of the Knockout Cup for tier one teams. Cradley Heath Heathens were the winners for the third successive year if including the tied 1986 final.

First round

Quarter-finals

Semi-finals

Final

First leg

Second leg

Cradley Heath were declared Knockout Cup Champions, winning on aggregate 100-80.

Leading final averages

Riders & final averages
Belle Vue

 9.01
 8.18
 7.70
 7.22
 6.92
	 6.83
 4.97
 3.12

Bradford

 8.30 
 7.44
 6.02
 5.67
 5.29
 5.15
 4.64
 3.57

Coventry

 10.08
 10.04
 7.49
 7.02
 5.00
 4.85
 4.79

Cradley Heath

 10.06
 9.88
 8.22
 6.92 
 5.10
 4.50
 3.45

Ipswich

 9.34
 6.87
 6.75
 6.19
 6.07
 5.40
 4.97
 2.50
 2.40
 1.45

King's Lynn

 7.75 
 7.69 
 7.45
 7.26
 6.33
 6.24
 6.00
 3.90
 1.28

Oxford

 11.03 
 8.64 
 7.24
 6.97
 4.32
 3.91
 3.81
 2.80
 2.65

Reading

 8.98
 8.93
 8.20
 6.95
 5.63
 5.22
 3.09
 2.81

Sheffield

 9.51
 8.67
 7.16
 5.78
 5.30
 4.58
 4.00
 3.60
 3.60
 3.38

Swindon

 7.68 (6 matches only)
 7.48
 7.23
 7.22
 6.56
 5.94
 5.87
 5.41

Wolverhampton

 9.40
 7.67
 7.24
 6.11
 5.94
 5.73
 5.51
 5.46
 4.42

See also
List of United Kingdom Speedway League Champions
Knockout Cup (speedway)

References

British League
1988 in British motorsport
1988 in speedway